This is the discography of Belarusian-Norwegian singer-songwriter Alexander Rybak. He represented Norway at the Eurovision Song Contest 2009 in Moscow, Russia, and eventually went on to win the contest with 387 points—the highest tally any country achieved (under the 1975–2015 points system) in the history of Eurovision—with "Fairytale".

Albums

Studio albums

Singles

As lead artist

As featured artist

Promotional singles

Other songs

Guest appearances

Music videos

References

Notes

Sources

Discographies of Norwegian artists